Conus abbreviatus, common name Abbreviated cone snail, is a species of sea snail, a marine gastropod mollusk in the family Conidae, the cone snails and their allies.

Like all species within the genus Conus, these snails are predatory and venomous. They are capable of "stinging" humans, therefore live ones should be handled carefully.

Description
The shell of this species has spots which are more distant from one another and somewhat more regularly disposed than in Conus miliaris.

Distribution
This species occurs off the Hawaiian Islands.

Ecology 
Like all species within the genus Conus, these snails are predatory and venomous. They are capable of "stinging" humans, therefore live ones should be handled carefully or not at all.

References
This article incorporates public domain text from the reference.

 Filmer R.M. (2001). A Catalogue of Nomenclature and Taxonomy in the Living Conidae 1758 - 1998. Backhuys Publishers, Leiden. 388pp
 Tucker J.K. (2009). Recent cone species database. September 4, 2009 Edition
 Tucker J.K. & Tenorio M.J. (2009) Systematic classification of Recent and fossil conoidean gastropods. Hackenheim: Conchbooks. 296 pp.
 Severns, M. (2011). Shells of the Hawaiian Islands - The Sea Shells. Conchbooks, Hackenheim. 564 pp.
 Puillandre N., Duda T.F., Meyer C., Olivera B.M. & Bouchet P. (2015). One, four or 100 genera? A new classification of the cone snails. Journal of Molluscan Studies. 81: 1-23

External links
 Conus abbreviatus Reeve, 1843 at the Conus Biodiversity website
 Cone Shells - Knights of the Sea
 Gastropods.com: Conus abbreviatus; retrieved: 19 >January 2012

abbreviatus
Gastropods described in 1843